Sierra Ventures is an American venture capital firm based in San Mateo, California.  It is focused on early stage emerging technology companies.

History
The firm was founded by Peter Wendell in 1982 in Menlo Park, California. Early investments included Healtheon, Intuit, Micromuse, and StrataCom.

The firm is run by managing directors Mark Fernandes, Tim Guleri, and Ben Yu and is based in San Mateo, California.

Investments
As of 2019, Sierra Ventures had invested over $1.9 billion. The firm's initial investment averages between $500,000 and $7 million and on average it invests up to $15 million over the life of a company.

Sierra Ventures’ CXO Advisory Board, a group of Global 1000 Chief Information, Technology, Data, Security, and other technology focused Officers and IT executives, advises on the firm's strategic investment decisions.  The board also counsels portfolio companies on how to scale and adapt as necessary.

Sierra Ventures is currently investing out of its eleventh fund, which closed in 2016 with $170 million. In March 2019 the firm began raising its twelfth fund.

Some notable past investments include:

References

External links
 Sierra Ventures website

Financial services companies established in 1982
Venture capital firms of the United States
Companies based in San Mateo, California